All India Kashmir Committee was set up by Muslim leaders of British India, mainly British Punjab, to fight for the rights of Muslims in the princely state of Jammu and Kashmir. a number of other leaders were invited by Mirza Bashir-ud-Din Mahmood Ahmad to form the committee in order to gain political support and Spread their ideology which was opposed by majority of Muslims.

Background 

From the very beginning of his rule, in 1840s Maharajah Gulab Singh imposed a body of the harshest regulations upon the people of Kashmir and reduced them in effect to a state of humiliating bondage. Even grass, growing free, on which the people were wont to pasture their cattle was subjected to a heavy tax. Within a year of the Treaty of 1848, Lord Lawrence, the then Viceroy addressed a severe remonstrance but without any effect.  Abdulla Vakil and Nooruddin Qari Kashmiri were instrumental in propagating Islamic literature among the Muslim population of the state which included religious folk poetry and more complex religious discourses. This revival of Muslim identity was of great concern to the ruling elite in Kashmir.

On 13 July 1931, the situation became so critical the then Maharajah resorted to brutal force and seventy two Kashmiris were killed and hundreds wounded.

Mirza Basheer-ud Din Mahmood Ahmad, the Head of Ahmadiyya Muslim community, was very  aware of the situation as he visited the state in 1929 and observed the plight of the people living there. He invited on July 25, 1931, a dozens or so leading Muslims and he stressed upon them that some thing should be done to tell the helpless Kashmiris that there are people in India who are mindful of their lot. The committee was met with severe criticism by Indian National Congress and nationalist Hindu press. The committee was termed as an organized rebellion against the Maharaja of Kashmir and a conspiracy on the part of pan-Islamists. A very extensive media campaign was run by a prominent Hindu nationalist newspaper, Milaap against the organizers of the committee. A telegram was sent to Viceroy Willingdon informing him of the "agitation" being organized by the Muslim leaders of India. (Newspaper Milaap, Aug-Oct, 1931) Members of Kashmir Committee were involved in fund raising activities to help the victims of violence in Kashmir. An organized campaign of political awareness was run by the Committee which resulted in creation of a Muslim political revival in the state. Party offices were established in various towns and cities in Kashmir and political workers were activated to raise the awareness among the Muslim populations in Kashmir. (Inquilaab, 11, Mar 1934) After a year of its creation, prominent Muslim leaders urged the committee to elect Dr Iqbal as its president. 
Iqbal defeated some hideous moves for using the Kashmir Committee as a vessel for spreading of a particular religious doctrine (Ahmadiyya Islam Community) that he believed was against the tenets of Muslim faith.
Also during this period, an orthodox Islamic religious party under the name of Ahrars (Free) came into being, freely funded by Indian Congress party. They started agitation against Mirza Basheerud Deen Mahmood, as he was the leader of a sect of Islam at odds with the basic tenet of Islam.

He resigned from Presidency of the Kashmir Committee as a number of members in the committee had their own doubts after the agitations. Dr. Iqbal was elected the president after him, but 20 June 1932, he also resigned from the Presidency of the All India Kashmir Committee.

Due to internal dissent among different leaders of the committee and external influence of Ahrar, the All-India Kashmir committee ceased to exist within a few years of its conception.

Legacy 
Although the committee's identity was usurped by rising political enmity of Ahrar and Congress, Kashmir Committee can be called the precursor of the freedom movement in the state. Sheikh Abdullah emerged as a popular young leader for Kashmiri Muslims as a result of direct patronage from the committee members. The network of political workers which was developed by the initiatives of the committee evolved into a useful propaganda machine which would play a fundamental role in Kashmir movement in the coming decades. Above all else, the committee was responsible for raising the profile of the humanitarian situation in the region which resulted in improvement in the social status of Kashmiri Muslims.

References

Further reading

External links
Ahmadiyya movement and Kashmir

History of Kashmir
Kashmiri nationalism